Yes? No? is the debut extended play by South Korean singer Suzy. It was released by JYP Entertainment on January 24, 2017. The extended play features six original tracks.

Background and release
On December 2, 2016, Suzy was announced to be debuting as a solo singer in January 2017, becoming the second Miss A member to have released a solo album, after Fei. On January 10, JYP producer Park Jin-young was reported to have written the album's title track. On January 24, the album was officially released.

Track listing

Charts

Weekly charts

Monthly charts

Sales

Awards and nominations

Music program awards

Release history

References

External links 
 "Pretend" live
 "Yes No Maybe" music video
 "Yes No Maybe" special clip

JYP Entertainment EPs
Korean-language EPs
2017 EPs
Genie Music EPs